Voe is a settlement on the Northmavine peninsula of Mainland, Shetland, Scotland. It is at the head of Ronas Voe and just off the A970 road.

Whaling 
Two Norwegian whaling stations were constructed in Voe at the beginning of the 20th century - the Zetland Whale Fishing Company, set up by Christian Nielsen; and the Norrona Whale Fishing Company, set up by Peder Bogen - opened in April and June 1903 respectively, being the first whaling stations based in UK territory.

Whales caught by harpoon were dragged in by steamers. They were hauled up a wooden slip with a steam winch to take them ashore. They would then be cut up using blades on long handles called flensing knives. Species caught included fin whales, sperm whales, bowhead whales and bottlenose whales.

While some work was made available for the locals, there was push-back against the factories due to the smell of the operations and pollution left upon the nearby beaches. Those engaged in the herring fishing also believed that the waste products of processing the whales (some of which ended up in the sea) attracted sharks that frightened off the herring shoals. A committee to investigate these claims was set up in 1904, however it wasn't able to determine a connection between the whaling and a downturn in the herring catch. The stations operated until 1914. There is very little left of the whaling stations - as of 2019 only a few low walls remain to be seen.

Economics

Notes

References

Sources

External links
 Shetland Museum & Archives - photographs of the whaling stations.

Villages in Mainland, Shetland
Northmavine